Zagarise is an Arbëreshë village and comune in the province of Catanzaro in the Calabria region of southern Italy.

History 
The name of the settlement first appears in official documents in the 16th century. Zagarise became an independent village during the early 19th century, when feudalism was abolished in the Kingdom of Naples.

Geography
Zagarise can be found 28 km north of Catanzaro in the Simeri river valley. The town is bordered by Albi, Magisano, Mesoraca, Petronà, Sellia, Sellia Marina, Sersale, Soveria Simeri and Taverna.

Notable Buildings
A Parish Church known as Santa Maria Assunta can be found here with a  Portal built in 1521, while the rest of the church was rebuilt in 1783. There is also a Norman Tower that was built by the Falluca family when they owned the fief of Zagarise.

Gallery

References

Arbëresh settlements
Cities and towns in Calabria